The 1992 Schleswig-Holstein state election was held on 5 April 1992 to elect the members of the Landtag of Schleswig-Holstein. The incumbent Social Democratic Party (SPD) government led by Minister-President Björn Engholm narrowly retained its majority by a margin of one seat. The major change of the election was the entry of the national conservative German People's Union to the Landtag. The Free Democratic Party also re-entered the Landtag, while The Greens failed to surpass the threshold by a margin of 0.03%.

Parties
The table below lists parties represented in the previous Landtag of Schleswig-Holstein.

Election result

|-
| colspan=8| 
|-
! colspan="2" | Party
! Votes
! %
! +/-
! Seats 
! +/-
! Seats %
|-
| bgcolor=| 
| align=left | Social Democratic Party (SPD)
| align=right| 687,427
| align=right| 46.2
| align=right| 8.6
| align=right| 45
| align=right| 1
| align=right| 50.6
|-
| bgcolor=| 
| align=left | Christian Democratic Union (CDU)
| align=right| 503,510
| align=right| 33.8
| align=right| 0.5
| align=right| 32
| align=right| 5
| align=right| 36.0
|-
| bgcolor=| 
| align=left | German People's Union (DVU)
| align=right| 93,295
| align=right| 6.3
| align=right| 6.4
| align=right| 6
| align=right| 6
| align=right| 6.7
|-
| bgcolor=| 
| align=left | Free Democratic Party (FDP)
| align=right| 82,963
| align=right| 5.6
| align=right| 1.2
| align=right| 5
| align=right| 5
| align=right| 5.6
|-
| bgcolor=| 
| align=left | South Schleswig Voters' Association (SSW)
| align=right| 28,245
| align=right| 1.9
| align=right| 0.2
| align=right| 1
| align=right| ±0
| align=right| 1.1
|-
! colspan=8|
|-
| bgcolor=| 
| align=left | Alliance 90/The Greens (Grüne)
| align=right| 74,014
| align=right| 5.0
| align=right| 2.9
| align=right| 0
| align=right| ±0
| align=right| 0
|-
| bgcolor=| 
| align=left | The Republicans (REP)
| align=right| 18,225
| align=right| 1.2
| align=right| 0.6
| align=right| 0
| align=right| ±0
| align=right| 0
|-
| bgcolor=|
| align=left | Others
| align=right| 230
| align=right| 0.0
| align=right| 
| align=right| 0
| align=right| ±0
| align=right| 0
|-
! align=right colspan=2| Total
! align=right| 1,487,909
! align=right| 100.0
! align=right| 
! align=right| 89
! align=right| 15
! align=right| 
|-
! align=right colspan=2| Voter turnout
! align=right| 
! align=right| 71.7
! align=right| 5.7
! align=right| 
! align=right| 
! align=right| 
|}

Sources
 Wahlen in Schleswig-Holstein seit 1947

Elections in Schleswig-Holstein
Schleswig-Holstein
April 1992 events in Europe